Fatehjang Singh Bajwa (born 2 March 1958) is a Bharatiya Janata Party leader and was a member of INC. In the 2017 Punjab Legislative Assembly election, he was elected as the member of the Punjab Legislative Assembly from Qadian.

In 2022 Punjab Legislative Assembly election  he contested from Batala Assembly constituency but lost the election to Amansher Singh of Aam Aadmi Party.

References

Living people
Punjab, India MLAs 2017–2022
1958 births
People from Gurdaspur district
Indian National Congress politicians from Punjab, India
Bharatiya Janata Party politicians from Punjab